The 2013 Torneo Apertura was part of the 64th completed season of the Primera B de Chile.

San Luis de Quillota was tournament's champion.

League table

References

External links
 RSSSF 2013

Primera B de Chile seasons
Primera B
Chil